Thomas Crawley (10 November 1911 – 1977) was a Scottish footballer who played as a centre forward for Hamilton Academical, Motherwell, Preston North End and Coventry City.

He signed for Hamilton as a replacement for the injured David Wilson and moved to Motherwell for the same reason to fill in for Willie MacFadyen, but was unable to displace either of them on a long-term basis despite a good scoring record (they were among the leading forwards of the period in Scottish football). He turned out for Accies once more in the summer of 1935 in the Rosebery Charity Cup in 1935 with Wilson unavailable.

Crawley then moved to England, firstly for a short spell with Preston. In his later years at Coventry (where he stayed until after World War II), he moved back to play at centre half. During the war he made guest appearances for Nottingham Forest and Leicester City.

His son Tommy and grandson Ian both played in non-league football in the East Midlands, Ian winning the FA Vase with VS Rugby and the FA Trophy with Telford United in the 1980s.

References

1911 births
1977 deaths
Date of death missing
Footballers from South Lanarkshire
People from Blantyre, South Lanarkshire
Association football inside forwards
Scottish footballers
Motherwell F.C. players
Hamilton Academical F.C. players
Preston North End F.C. players
Coventry City F.C. players
Nottingham Forest F.C. wartime guest players
Leicester City F.C. wartime guest players
Blantyre Victoria F.C. players
Scottish Junior Football Association players
Scottish Football League players
English Football League players